Manuel Olivares Lapeña (2 April 1909 – 16 February 1976) was a Spanish football striker and manager.

In only 82 La Liga games he scored 56 goals, mostly for Real Madrid with which he won three major titles.

Club career
Born in Son Servera, Balearic Islands, Olivares joined Deportivo Alavés in 1928 and made his debut in La Liga in the 1930–31 season, scoring ten goals in 14 games as the Basques finished in eighth position (out of ten clubs). In the following off-season, he signed for country giants Real Madrid.

In his first two years with the Merengues, Olivares netted at an impressive rate, winning two consecutive national championships and the 1934 Copa del Presidente de la República. In the 1932–33 campaign, he scored 16 goals in only 14 matches to conquer the Pichichi Trophy.

Olivares spent a further three years in the top division, with Donostia CF, Real Zaragoza and Hércules CF. In 1935 he started his coaching career with the second club, going on to act as player-coach for several teams until 1943 and definitely retiring as a player with Algeciras CF in the regional leagues.

In 1944–45, Olivares led UD Salamanca to Segunda División, being relegated the following season. He died on 16 February 1976 in Madrid, at the age of 66.

International career
Olivares played once for Spain, appearing in a 0–2 friendly loss in Czechoslovakia on 14 June 1930.

Honours

Player
Real Madrid
La Liga: 1931–32, 1932–33
Copa del Presidente de la República: 1934
Pichichi Trophy: 1932–33

Manager
Salamanca
Tercera División: 1944–45

External links

1909 births
1976 deaths
People from Son Servera
Spanish footballers
Footballers from Mallorca
La Liga players
Association football forwards
Deportivo Alavés players
Real Madrid CF players
Real Sociedad footballers
Real Zaragoza players
Hércules CF players
CD Málaga footballers
Algeciras CF footballers
Spain international footballers
Spanish football managers
La Liga managers
Segunda División managers
Real Zaragoza managers
Hércules CF managers
UD Salamanca managers
Burgos CF (1936) managers
Real Betis managers
Orihuela Deportiva CF managers
Pichichi Trophy winners
Basque Country international footballers